Hans Alexander Ekblad (born 7 August 1987) is a Swedish former footballer.

References

External links 
 

1987 births
Living people
Swedish footballers
Association football defenders
IK Brage players
Dalkurd FF players
Allsvenskan players
People from Borlänge Municipality
Sportspeople from Dalarna County